Karamzin is a Russian masculine surname, its feminine counterpart is Karamzina. It originates from the Tatar surname Kara-Murza, meaning black lord, and may refer to
Aurora Karamzin (1808–1902), Finnish-Swede philanthropist, wife of Andrei Karamzin, a son of Nikolay
Nikolay Karamzin (1766–1826), Russian writer, poet, historian and critic

References

Russian-language surnames